Chang Hsien-yi (born 1943) served as deputy director of Taiwan's Institute of Nuclear Energy Research (INER) before defecting to the United States of America in 1988. Recruited by the CIA, he exposed the secret nuclear program of the Republic of China (commonly called Taiwan) to the United States and was consequently placed under witness protection. Chang's information resulted in the United States government forcing Taiwan to shut down its nuclear weapons program.

Early life
Chang was born in 1943 in Haikou City, Hainan, with Taiwanese parents. He went to Taichung Second National High School, and attended National Tsing Hua University, where he obtained a Bachelor of Science degree.

Recruitment by the CIA
In 1967, Chang graduated from the military's Chung Cheng Institute of Technology (now National Defense University). Then from the 1970s, he was recruited by a case officer of the CIA while studying in America. While rising through the ranks in Taiwan, he passed on information to the USA. By 1987, as Deputy Director of INER, he was well-positioned to provide information about the country's secret small-scale plutonium extraction facility. At this time, the Reagan administration considered it possible that the secret program was proceeding without the knowledge of Taiwan's president Lee Teng-hui.

Defection to the United States of America

Colonel Chang did not return to Taiwan from a holiday on 9 January 1988, and instead coerced his family to defect with him to the United States. Chang brought with him numerous top-secret documents that could not have been obtained by other means, though an article from the BBC claims Chang did not take a single document. A study into the secret program concluded that at the time of Chang's defection, Taiwan was one or two years away from being able to complete a nuclear bomb. According to The Economist, there were plans to fit nuclear warheads to Taiwan's Tien Ma, or 'Sky Horse' missile, which had an estimated range of up to 1,000 kilometres. There were also plans to load miniaturised nuclear weapons into the auxiliary fuel tanks of the Indigenous Defense Fighter.  Armed with Chang's documents, President Reagan insisted that Taiwan shut down its program.

After the testimony in a classified hearing in parliament, Colonel Chang was put in a witness protection program. A ROC military agent stationed in US used Chang's child data to found out his registry to an elementary school in Washington, D.C., then successfully traced the kid to locate his home. The agent knew Chang's family being under the witness program, therefore secretly contacted a journalist to knock on their house door for interview without notification, which shocked the family. They were moved away overnight, and US authority dispelled the agent to return to Taiwan.

Taiwan's Ministry of Defence denied that Chang had been a CIA informant. Its retired Chief of General Staff (1981-1989), General Hau Pei-tsun, claimed that for more than a decade previously, Taiwan already had the potential to develop nuclear weapons. A former member of President Lee Teng-hui's national security team, Chang Jung-feng, has described Chang's actions as a 'betrayal'. The CIA has refused to discuss Chang's defection. James R. Lilley, who served as CIA station chief in Beijing, said the case should be 'publicly acknowledged as a success'.

Chang is quoted in The Taipei Times as saying that he was "...motivated by fears that his research into nuclear weapons would be used by 'politically ambitious' people who would harm Taiwan."

Nuclear energy in Taiwan
Taiwan uses nuclear power for some of its electricity generation, but since 1988, its official position has been that it will not develop nuclear weapons. Were it to do so, China has said it would be 'a legitimate reason' to launch an attack on the island.

See also
 Taiwan and weapons of mass destruction

References 

Living people
Republic of China Army
1943 births
Taiwanese people from Hainan
People from Haikou
Taiwanese defectors
Defectors to the United States
Nuclear weapons program of the Republic of China